List of Moroccan flags This is a list of flags used in Morocco. For more information about the national flag, visit the article Flag of Morocco.

National Flags

Royal Standard

Military Flags

Historical flags

Pre-Colonial Period

French Morocco

Spanish Morocco

Republic of the Rif

Tangier International Zone

Regional flags

Sources

External links

Lists and galleries of flags
 
Flags
Flags